The 2009 Eastern Kentucky Colonels football team represented Eastern Kentucky University in the 2009 NCAA Division I FCS football season. The team was led by Dean Hood, the 2008 Ohio Valley Conference (OVC) Roy Kidd Coach of the Year.  Hood was in his second season as head coach. The season marked the Colonels' 100th season of play. The Colonels played their home games at Roy Kidd Stadium in Richmond, Kentucky. The team finished the season with a record of 5–6 overall and 5–3 in OVC play.

Schedule

Coaching staff

References

Eastern Kentucky
Eastern Kentucky Colonels football seasons
Eastern Kentucky Colonels football